Armenia is a landlocked country in West Asia, situated in the South Caucasus region of the Caucasus, bordered on the north and east by Georgia and Azerbaijan and on the south and west by Iran, Azerbaijan's exclave Nakhchivan, and Turkey.

The terrain is mostly mountainous and flat, with fast flowing rivers and few forests but with many trees. The climate is highland continental: hot summers and cold winters.

Physical environment
 
Armenia is located in the southern Caucasus, the region southwest of Russia between the Black Sea and the Caspian Sea. Modern Armenia occupies part of historical Armenia, whose ancient centers were in the valley of the Araks River and the region around Lake Van in Turkey. Armenia is bordered on the north by Georgia, on the east by Azerbaijan, on the south by Iran, and on the west by Turkey.

Topography and drainage

Twenty-five million years ago, a geological upheaval pushed up the Earth's crust to form the Armenian Plateau, creating the complex topography of modern Armenia. The Lesser Caucasus range extends through northern Armenia, runs southeast between Lake Sevan and Azerbaijan, then passes roughly along the Armenian-Azerbaijani border to Iran. Thus situated, the mountains make travel from north to south difficult. Geological turmoil continues in the form of devastating earthquakes, which have plagued Armenia. In December 1988, the second largest city in the republic, Leninakan (now Gyumri), was heavily damaged by a massive quake that killed more than 25,000 people.

About half of Armenia's area of approximately  has an elevation of at least , and only 3% of the country lies below . To the southwest of the range is the Armenian Plateau, which slopes southwestward toward the Araks River on the Turkish border. The plateau is masked by intermediate mountain ranges and extinct volcanoes. Most of the population lives in the western and northwestern parts of the country, where the two major cities, Yerevan and Gyumri, are located.

The valleys of the Debed and Akstafa rivers form the chief routes into Armenia from the north as they pass through the mountains. Other main lakes are: Arpi, Sev, Akna .

Terrain is most rugged in the extreme southeast, which is drained by the Bargushat River, and most moderate in the Araks River valley to the extreme southwest. Most of Armenia is drained by the Araks or its tributary, the Hrazdan, which flows from Lake Sevan. The Araks forms most of Armenia's border with Turkey and Iran, while the Zangezur Mountains form the border between Armenia's southern province of Syunik and Azerbaijan's adjacent Nakhchivan Autonomous Republic.

Climate

Temperatures in Armenia generally depend upon elevation. Mountain formations block the moderating climatic influences of the Mediterranean Sea and the Black Sea, creating wide seasonal variations with cold snowy winters, and warm to hot summers. Despite the harshness of winter in most parts (with frosts reaching  and lower in Shirak region), the fertility of the plateau's volcanic soil made Armenia one of the world's earliest sites of agricultural activity.

Area and boundaries

Area:total: 29,743 km2

country comparison to the world: 143
land: 28,203 km2water: 1,540 km2

Area comparative
Australia comparative: about one third (33%) the size of Tasmania
Canada comparative: greater than half (56%) the size of Nova Scotia
Turkey comparative: about a quarter (24%) smaller than the size of  Konya Province.
United Kingdom comparative: about one third larger (30%) than Wales
United States comparative: slightly smaller (7%) than Maryland
EU comparative: slightly smaller (8%) than Belgium

Land boundaries:total: 1,570 kmborder countries:

Azerbaijan 566 km, Azerbaijan-Nakhchivan exclave 221 km, Georgia 219 km, Iran 44 km, Turkey 311 km

Coastline:

0 km (landlocked)

Elevation extremes:lowest point: 375mhighest point: Mount Aragats 4,090 m

Extreme points of Armenia:North:
TavushSouth:
Syunik'West:
ShirakEast:
Syunik'

Resources and land use

Natural resources:
deposits of gold, copper, molybdenum, zinc, bauxite

Armenia has significant deposits of copper, molybdenum and gold, as well as smaller deposits of zinc, lead and silver. Some copper-molybdenum and polymetallic ore deposits are rich in elements such as bismuth, tellurium, selenium, gallium, indium, thallium, rhenium and germanium.

Land use:
arable land:4.456 km², 15.8%permanent crops: 1.9%permanent pastures: 4.2%forest (2018): 11.2%other: 31.2% (2011)

Irrigated land: 2.084 km2 (2018)

Total renewable water resources:

7.77 m³ (2011) Armenia is considered to be a big water “supplier” in the Caspian basin; as a result, the country lacks water, especially in summer when the rate of evaporation exceeds the amount of precipitation. That is the main reason why since ancient times inhabitants have built water reservoirs and irrigation canals in the area. Lake Sevan contains the largest amount of water in the country.

Freshwater withdrawal (domestic/industrial/agricultural):total: 2.86 km³/yr (40%/6%/54%)per capita: 929.7 m³/yr (2010)

See also

Atlas of Armenia
Biogeographic regions of Europe
Geography of Asia
Geography of Europe
Geology of Armenia

References

 
Armenia